Kalliomäki is a Finnish surname. Notable people with the surname include:

 Antti Kalliomäki (born 1947), Finnish politician and former athlete
 Tapani Kalliomäki (born 1970), Finnish stage and film actor

Finnish-language surnames